Milton Green Sublette (c. 1801–1837), was an American frontiersman, trapper, fur trader, explorer, and mountain man.  He was the second of five Sublette brothers prominent in the western fur trade; William, Andrew, and Solomon. Milton was one of five men who formed the Rocky Mountain Fur Company to buy out the investment of his brother William L. Sublette, Jedediah S. Smith and Dave E. Jackson.

Sublette injured his leg in an 1826 Indian battle in the American Southwest; it was slow to heal and repeatedly became seriously infected.  After it was removed by a surgeon named Farrar in St. Louis in 1835 (most likely Dr. Bernard Gaines Farrar), he walked on a "cork leg" procured by Robert Campbell through his brother Hugh Campbell. Later, he rode in a Dearborn wagon, drawn by one mule, as he left the St. Louis area heading for the west.  Later infections in the leg led to his early death at Fort John, on the Laramie River, now in Wyoming. In 1843, Solomon Sublette, while traveling with William D. Stewart and William L. Sublette's caravan, took a grave marker to Fort John and placed it on Milton's grave.  Today, Milton's actual grave site is lost to us, due to the US Military placing a building over the site of Fort William's grave yard.

Sublette was reported to be a man of dynamic and attractive personality, with a strong tendency toward impetuous action and speech.  He was called "the Thunderbolt of the Rockies."

See also
 Pierre's Hole

References

Sources
 Nunis, Doyce B. Jr., Milton G. Sublette, featured in Trappers of the Far West, Leroy R. Hafen, editor.  1972, Arthur H. Clark Company, reprint University of Nebraska Press, October 1983.  
 Utley, Robert M., A Life Wild and Perilous: Mountain Men and the Paths to the Pacific, 1997, Henry Holt and Company.

1801 births
1837 deaths
People from Somerset, Kentucky
American fur traders
Mountain men